The following is a list of "M" codes for Medical Subject Headings (MeSH), as defined by the United States National Library of Medicine (NLM).

This list continues the information at List of MeSH codes (L01). Codes following these are found at List of MeSH codes (N01). For other MeSH codes, see List of MeSH codes.

The source for this content is the set of 2006 MeSH Trees from the NLM.

– persons

– abortion applicants

– adult children

– age groups
  – adolescent
  – adult
  – aged
  –  80 and over aged
  – frail elderly
  – middle aged
  – child
  –  preschool child
  – infant
  –  newborn infant
  –  low birth weight infant
  –  small for gestational age infant
  –  very low birth weight infant
  –  postmature infant
  –  premature infant

– caregivers

– child of impaired parents

–  abandoned child

–  exceptional child
  –  gifted child

–  unwanted child

– consultants

– crime victims

– disabled persons
  – amputees
  – disabled children
  – hearing impaired persons
  – mentally disabled persons
  – mentally ill persons
  – visually impaired persons

– famous persons

– friends

– homebound persons

– homeless persons
  – homeless youth

– jehovah's witnesses

– legal guardians
  – proxy

– medically uninsured

– men
  –  male nurses

– mentors

– minors

– multiple birth offspring
  – quadruplets
  – quintuplets
  – triplets
  – twins
  –  dizygotic twins
  –  monozygotic twins

– occupational groups
  – administrative personnel
  – health facility administrators
  – hospital administrators
  –  hospital chief executive officers
  – nurse administrators
  – physician executives
  – trustees
  – clergy
  – ethicists
  – faculty
  –  dental faculty
  –  medical faculty
  –  nursing faculty
  – foreign professional personnel
  – foreign medical graduates
  – health personnel
  – allied health personnel
  – animal technicians
  – community health aides
  – dental auxiliaries
  – dental assistants
  – dental hygienists
  – dental technicians
  – denturists
  – emergency medical technicians
  – home health aides
  – medical record administrators
  – medical secretaries
  – medical receptionists
  – nurses' aides
  – psychiatric aides
  – operating room technicians
  – pharmacists' aides
  – physician assistants
  – ophthalmic assistants
  – pediatric assistants
  – caregivers
  – coroners and medical examiners
  – dental staff
  –  hospital dental staff
  – dentists
  –  women dentists
  –  dental faculty
  –  medical faculty
  –  nursing faculty
  – health educators
  – health facility administrators
  – hospital administrators
  –  hospital chief executive officers
  – infection control practitioners
  – laboratory personnel
  – medical staff
  –  hospital medical staff
  – hospitalists
  – nurses
  – nurse administrators
  – nurse anesthetists
  – nurse clinicians
  – nurse midwives
  – nurse practitioners
  –  male nurses
  – nursing staff
  –  hospital nursing staff
  –  hospital personnel
  –  hospital dental staff
  – hospital administrators
  –  hospital chief executive officers
  – hospital volunteers
  – hospital auxiliaries
  –  hospital medical staff
  – hospitalists
  –  hospital nursing staff
  – pharmacists
  – physician executives
  – physicians
  – foreign medical graduates
  – hospitalists
  –  family physicians
  –  women physicians
  – veterinarians
  – lawyers
  – librarians
  – military personnel
  – missions and missionaries
  – police
  – research personnel

– parents
  – fathers
  – mothers
  – single parent
  – surrogate mothers

– patients
  –  hospitalized adolescent
  –  institutionalized adolescent
  –  hospitalized child
  –  institutionalized child
  – inpatients
  – outpatients
  – patient dropouts
  – survivors
  – hiv long-term survivors

– population groups
  – continental population groups
  – african continental ancestry group
  – african americans
  – american native continental ancestry group
  –  central american indians
  – Inuit
  – asian continental ancestry group
  – asian americans
  – european continental ancestry group
  – oceanic ancestry group
  – ethnic groups
  – african americans
  – arabs
  – asian americans
  – gypsies
  – Hispanic Americans
  – mexican americans
  – inuits 
  – jews

– prisoners

– refugees

– research personnel
  – astronauts

– research subjects

– sexual partners

– siblings

– single person

– spouses

– students
  – student dropouts
  –  health occupations students
  –  dental students
  –  medical students
  –  nursing students
  –  pharmacy students
  –  premedical students
  –  public health students

– survivors
  – hiv long-term survivors

– terminally ill

– tissue donors
  – blood donors
  – living donors

– transients and migrants

– veterans

– visitors to patients

– voluntary workers
  – hospital volunteers
  – hospital auxiliaries

– vulnerable populations

– women
  – battered women
  –  women dentists
  –  women physicians
  – pregnant women
  –  working women

The list continues at List of MeSH codes (N01).

M01